Frederick Eveleigh Ellis was Dean of Nassau from 1952  to 1965.

Ellis was educated at Wycliffe College, Toronto and ordained in 1926. After a curacy in Douglas, Ontario he held incumbencies at Chalk River, Woodside and Halifax.

References

University of Toronto alumni
Deans of Nassau